Competing endogenous RNAs (ceRNAs, also refer as miRNA sponges) hypothesis: ceRNAs regulate other RNA transcripts (e.g., PTEN) by competing for shared microRNAs. They are playing important roles in developmental, physiological and pathological processes, such as cancer. Multiple classes of ncRNAs (lncRNAs, circRNAs, pseudogenes) and protein-coding mRNAs function as key ceRNAs (sponges) and to regulate the expression of mRNAs in plants and mammalian cells.

This competing endogenous RNA (ceRNA) databases and resources is a compilation of databases and web portals and servers used for ceRNA prediction and ceRNA networks.

References

RNA
MicroRNA
Genetics databases

zh:CeRNA资源及数据库